Pup Creek is a stream in Daviess County, Kentucky, in the United States. It is a tributary of the Ohio River.

Pup Creek was so named from an incident when pioneers drowned puppies in this stream.

See also
List of rivers of Kentucky

References

Rivers of Daviess County, Kentucky
Rivers of Kentucky